Transamerica is a 2005 American comedy-drama film written and directed by Duncan Tucker, and starring Felicity Huffman and Kevin Zegers. Released by IFC Films and The Weinstein Company, the film premiered at the Berlin International Film Festival on February 14, 2005,  and to theaters in the United States on December 2, 2005.

The screenplay, inspired in part by conversations between Tucker and his then roommate Katherine Connella, tells the story of Bree (Huffman), a trans woman, who goes on a road trip with her long-lost son Toby (Zegers).

The film was recognized with positive reviews and won multiple awards, including Huffman winning a Golden Globe and a nomination for an Academy Award.

Plot
One week before her vaginoplasty, a trans woman named Sabrina "Bree" Osbourne receives an unexpected phone call from a young man named Toby Wilkins, a 17-year-old jailed in New York City. He asks for Stanley Schupak (Bree's deadname), claiming to be her son. Bree was previously unaware she had a son; she now wants to break with her past and renounce him. However, Bree's therapist refuses to sign off for her operation if she does not face up to her past ties.

Bree flies from Los Angeles to New York City to bail Toby out of jail. Toby is a foul-mouthed runaway who is a small-time drug user and male "hustler". His mother committed suicide when he was a child after which he was raised by his stepfather, whom he says he does not want to see. Bree pretends to be a Christian missionary and persuades Toby to ride with her back to the West Coast, secretly planning to leave him at his stepfather's along the way. When they arrive in the town of Callicoon, Kentucky, it turns out that Toby's stepfather was very abusive and he molested him several times in his youth. Bree and Toby continue driving to Los Angeles together. They also stop by a house in Dallas where a group of transgender women (many of whom are old friends of Bree's) are hosting a gender pride gathering. Later on in the trip, when Bree goes to the restroom, Toby accidentally discovers that Bree has male genitalia. He tries to be open-minded about it but is angry that Bree had not told him prior.

After their car and money are stolen by a young hitchhiking hippie who calls himself a "peyote shaman", Toby makes some money by prostituting himself to a truck driver. To Bree he pretends that he got the money from selling some drugs he had taken along for his own use. They get a ride with a kindly rancher, Calvin Many Goats to Bree's parents' house in Phoenix, Arizona. Calvin and Bree hit it off and flirt a little, which disturbs Toby. Here they find her pampered and self-centred mother Elizabeth, her Jewish father Murray who seems to be dominated by Elizabeth, and her rebellious and sarcastic sister Sydney. Elizabeth disapproves of Bree's transition (it is mentioned that she has been estranged for some time), but is astonished to find out she has a grandson. She is kind to Toby and invites him to stay and live with them. Toby enjoys the luxury and kindness, but hesitates because he does not like how disrespectful they are to Bree. Misunderstanding his feelings for Bree, he tries to seduce her, saying that he will marry her if she wants. Bree realizes she must tell Toby the truth immediately, saying that she was his real father. Toby is appalled and infuriated that Bree had not disclosed this earlier. Overnight he steals money and valuable antiques from the house and disappears. Heartbroken, Bree returns to Los Angeles via a plane ticket bought by her parents. Her family finally accepts her calling herself Bree and she has a successful surgery, but is unhappy because she feels she will never again see or hear from Toby. The therapist visits Bree in recovery. After she confesses she made a mistake, Bree sobs on her shoulder.

Some months later, Bree is surprised to see Toby at her front door. Bree invites him inside and he tells her that in the meantime he has turned 18; he has bleached his hair blonde, and has become an adult actor in gay pornographic films in Los Angeles. Bree is also vibrant, happy, and enjoying her job as a waitress at the restaurant where she was formerly a busser; She has also dyed her hair blonde and now wears more colorful clothes. Bree and Toby reconcile, seemingly happy to have each other.

Cast
 Felicity Huffman as Sabrina Claire "Bree" Osbourne 
 Kevin Zegers as Toby Wilkins, Bree's son
 Graham Greene as Calvin Many Goats
 Fionnula Flanagan as Elizabeth Schupak, Bree's mom
 Burt Young as Murray Schupak, Bree's dad
 Carrie Preston as Sydney Schupak, Bree's sister
 Elizabeth Peña as Margaret, Bree's psychiatrist
 Venida Evans as Arletty
 Teala Dunn as Little Girl
 Calpernia Addams as Calpernia
 Stella Maeve as Taylor
 Raynor Scheine as Bobby Jensen, Toby's step-father
 Danny Burstein as Dr. Spikowsky
 Andrea James as the voice coach
 Forrie J. Smith as New Mexico arrowhead seller

Production
In reference to her nude scene in the bathtub, Felicity Huffman said there was supposed to be a lot more bubbles, but because they were 'a little indie running a day late and a dollar short', they tried dish detergent and other things but there was not the time to do something else, so she was more exposed than anticipated."

Soundtrack
The Transamerica soundtrack includes cuts written by members of Old Crow Medicine Show. Christopher Day "Critter" Fuqua wrote "Take 'Em Away", performed by the group. "We're All in This Together" was written by Ketch Secor and Willie Watson, also performed by Old Crow. Both songs were published by Blood Donor Music, Administered by Bug Music, Inc. (BMI), and made available courtesy of Nettwerk Productions. "Travelin' Thru" was written and performed by Dolly Parton. The song was nominated for an Academy Award for Best Song, for the Golden Globe for Best Original Song, and for the Broadcast Film Critics Association for Best Song. According to the New York Times website, "Travelin' Thru" won for best original song at the Phoenix Film Critics Society Awards 2005.  It was also nominated for a Grammy Award for Best Song from a Movie.

Critical reception
The film received generally positive reviews. The review aggregator Rotten Tomatoes reported that 77% of critics gave Transamerica positive reviews, based on 145 reviews, and an average rating of 6.79/10, with the consensus that "a terrific performance by Felicity Huffman carries this unconventional but touching transgender road movie." Metacritic reported the film had an average score of 66 out of 100, based on 37 reviews. Film critic Roger Ebert stated that "Felicity Huffman brings great empathy and tact to her performance as Bree."

Nominations and awards
 Independent Spirit Awards
 Won – Best Female Lead (Felicity Huffman)
 Won – Best First Screenplay (Duncan Tucker)
 Nominated – Best First Feature – (Duncan Tucker, Sebastian Dungan, Linda Moran, Rene Bastian)
 Academy Awards
 Nominated – Best Actress (Felicity Huffman)
 Nominated – Best Original Song (Dolly Parton, for the song "Travelin' Thru")
 Berlin International Film Festival
 Won – Reader Jury of the Siegessäule
 Broadcast Film Critics Association
 Nominated – Best Actress (Felicity Huffman)
 Nominated – Best Song (Dolly Parton, for the song "Travelin' Thru")
 Deauville Film Festival
 Won – Best Screenplay (Duncan Tucker)
 Nominated – Grand Special Prize
 GLAAD Media Awards
 Won – Outstanding Film – Limited Release
 Golden Globe Awards
 Won – Best Actress in a Drama (Felicity Huffman)
 Nominated – Best Original Song (Dolly Parton, for the song "Travelin' Thru")
 National Board of Review
 Won – Best Actress (Felicity Huffman)
 Phoenix Film Critics Society Awards 2005
 Won – Best Original Song (Dolly Parton, for the song "Travelin' Thru")
 Satellite Awards
 Won – Best Actress (Felicity Huffman)
 Screen Actors Guild Award
 Nominated – Best Actress in a Lead Role (Felicity Huffman)
 Tribeca Film Festival
 Won – Best Actress (Felicity Huffman)
 Cannes Film Festival 2006
 Won (Chopard Trophy) – Male Revelation Kevin Zegers
 San Diego Film Festival 2005
 Won – Best Actress (Felicity Huffman)

Home media
The film was released on DVD on May 23, 2006, in North America. There are no plans for a North American Blu-ray release for it yet. However, the Blu-ray was released in Italy.

In popular culture
The film is referenced in the comedy film Knocked Up, when the character of Jason admits that he was attracted to Huffman, stating that ever since he saw Transamerica, he can't get her out of his mind.

See also
 Different for Girls (1996)
 List of transgender characters in film and television

References

External links

 
 
 
 
 
 

2000s buddy comedy-drama films
2000s coming-of-age comedy-drama films
2005 independent films
2005 LGBT-related films
2000s road comedy-drama films
2000s sex comedy films
2005 films
American buddy comedy-drama films
American coming-of-age comedy-drama films
American independent films
American LGBT-related films
American road comedy-drama films
American sex comedy films
Bisexuality-related films
Country music films
2005 directorial debut films
2000s English-language films
Films featuring a Best Drama Actress Golden Globe-winning performance
Films scored by David Mansfield
Films set in Arizona
Films shot in Los Angeles
Films shot in New York City
IFC Films films
LGBT-related buddy comedy-drama films
LGBT-related coming-of-age films
Films about LGBT and Judaism
Films about trans women
LGBT-related sex comedy films
The Weinstein Company films
2000s American films